Penn State Health Milton S. Hershey Medical Center (MSHMC) is a 628-bed non-profit, tertiary, research and academic medical center located in Hershey, Pennsylvania, servicing the Central Pennsylvania area. MSHMC is the region's only university-level academic medical center. The hospital is owned by the Penn State Health System and is the largest hospital in the system. MSHMC is affiliated with the Pennsylvania State University College of Medicine. MSHMC is also an ACS designated level I adult and pediatric trauma center and has a helipad to handle medevac patients. Attached to the medical center is the 122 bed Penn State Children's Hospital, which treats infants, children, adolescents, and young adults up to the age of 21.

History 

In 1963, the M. S. Hershey Foundation offered $50 million to the Pennsylvania State University to establish a medical school and teaching hospital in Hershey, Pennsylvania. With this grant and $21.3 million from the U.S. Public Health Service, the university built a medical school, teaching hospital, and research center. Ground was broken in 1966 and Penn State's College of Medicine opened its doors to the first class of students in 1967. Penn State Milton S. Hershey Medical Center accepted its first patients in 1970.

The original buildings at the center included the Medical Science Building and medical center, Animal Research Farm, Laundry and Steam Plant, and University Manor Apartments. Many additions have been made to the academic and patient-care facilities.

The center also serves nursing students from Penn State College of Nursing B.S. degree program and students from other Penn State health-related programs. The extended B.S. degree program for nurses is offered in conjunction with the College of Health and Human Development. Continuing education programs serve health-care professionals throughout Pennsylvania, with enrollments exceeding 51,000 each year. The center conducts basic and clinical research, supported by more than $100 million in awards from federal, state, and private agencies, businesses, and individuals.

By the end of June 2010, the center admitted nearly 27,000 patients and provided care through over 854,000 outpatient and 57,000 emergency-service visits. Penn State Hershey Medical Center has over 8,801 employees, 400 volunteers, and the College of Medicine enrolls more than 800 students annually.

Facilities

Pennsylvania State University College of Medicine 

The Pennsylvania State University College of Medicine (PSCOM), known simply as "Penn State College of Medicine" is the medical school of Penn State. While the main Penn State campus is in State College PA, this school is located in Hershey, Pennsylvania in order to align with Penn State Milton S. Hershey Medical Center, the medical school's principal affiliate. The medical school includes 26 basic science and clinical departments and a broad range of clinical programs conducted at its hospital affiliates and numerous ambulatory care sites in the region.

Milton S. Hershey Medical Center 
The Penn State Health Milton S. Hershey Medical Center (MSHMC) is a 628-bed non-profit, research and academic medical center located in Hershey, Pennsylvania, providing tertiary and healthcare needs for the Central Pennsylvania and the capital region. MSHMC is the region's only academic university-level teaching center. The hospital is owned by the Pennsylvania State University Health System and is the second largest hospital in the system. MSHMC is affiliated with the Penn State College of Medicine. MSHMC is also a designated level I trauma center and has a helipad to handle medevac patients.

Penn State Children's Hospital 

The Penn State Children's Hospital (PSCH) is a nationally ranked women's and pediatric acute care teaching hospital located in Hershey, Pennsylvania. The hospital has 134 pediatric beds. PSCH is affiliated with the Penn State College of Medicine and is located at the Milton S. Hershey Medical Center. The hospital provides comprehensive pediatric specialties and subspecialties to infants, children, teens, and young adults aged 0–21 throughout central Pennsylvania and surrounding regions. Penn State Children's Hospital also sometimes treats adults that require pediatric care. PSCH also features an Commonwealth of Pennsylvania designated Level 1 Pediatric Trauma Center, 1 of 4 in the state.

It maintains the region's only Level IV (highest level) neonatal intensive care unit (NICU) and Level I (highest level) pediatric trauma center. It is staffed by 200 pediatric medical and surgical specialists.

See also 
 Penn State Children's Hospital
List of hospitals in Harrisburg
 Penn State Cancer Institute
 Medical schools in Pennsylvania

References

External links 

 

Penn State Milton S. Hershey Medical Center
Hospital buildings completed in 1970
Hospitals established in 1966
Pennsylvania State University colleges
Hospitals in Harrisburg, Pennsylvania
Hershey, Pennsylvania
Teaching hospitals in Pennsylvania
Educational institutions established in 1966
Universities and colleges in Dauphin County, Pennsylvania
1966 establishments in Pennsylvania
Hershey
Trauma centers